Paquita de Ronda (1919–2009) was a Spanish singer and film actress. She played the lead role in the 1950 film The Maragatan Sphinx (1950).

Selected filmography
 The Maragatan Sphinx (1950)
 Country Corner (1950)

References

Bibliography 
 Goble, Alan. The Complete Index to Literary Sources in Film. Walter de Gruyter, 1999.

External links 
 

1919 births
2009 deaths
Spanish film actresses
People from Málaga
Spanish emigrants to Mexico
20th-century Spanish women singers
20th-century Spanish singers